In astronomy, a thalassogen denotes a substance capable of forming a planetary ocean. Thalassogens are not necessarily life sustaining, although most interest has been in the context of extraterrestrial life.

The term was coined by Isaac Asimov in his essay "The Thalassogens", later published in his 1972 collection The Left Hand of the Electron. Said term was coined via the Ancient Greek suffix thalasso- ("sea") and the prefix -gen ("producer").

Elements making up thalassogens have to be relatively abundant, the substance must be chemically stable in its environment, and must remain liquid under the conditions found on some planets. Freitas gives the following table, noting that the liquid range typically increases with increasing pressure:

The critical temperature and pressure represents the point where the distinction between gas and liquid vanishes, a possible upper limit for life (though life in supercritical fluids has been discussed both in science and fiction, such as in Close to Critical by Hal Clement).

Later authors have also suggested sulfuric acid, ethane, and water/ammonia mixtures as possible thalassogens. The discovery of possible subsurface oceans on moons such as Europa (and, less obviously, Ganymede and Callisto) also extends the range of possible environments.

See also

 Extraterrestrial liquid water
 Hypothetical types of biochemistry

References

Astrobiology
Astronomical hypotheses
Planetary science